Marion C. Moore is a public middle school and high school located in Louisville, Kentucky, United States.

History
In 2017, the name of the school was changed from Moore Traditional School to Marion C. Moore School.

On November 22, 2019 the Marion C. Moore Instagram page made a post announcing Rob Fulk’s retirement as principal. It was formatted as a letter, written by Rob himself.

Notable alumni
 Mekale McKay, NFL player

References

Jefferson County Public Schools (Kentucky)
Public high schools in Kentucky
Educational institutions established in 1969
1969 establishments in Kentucky
High schools in Louisville, Kentucky